Chelton Linger (born April 14, 1988 in Amsterdam) is a Dutch footballer who played for Eerste Divisie club FC Omniworld during the 2007-2009 football seasons.

References

External links
 voetbal international profile

Dutch footballers
Footballers from Amsterdam
Almere City FC players
Eerste Divisie players
1988 births
Living people
Association football forwards
21st-century Dutch people